The 1919 Army Cadets football team represented the United States Military Academy in the 1919 college football season. In their fifth non-consecutive season under head coach Charles Dudley Daly (Daly was Army's coach from 1913 to 1916), the Cadets compiled a  record, shut out five of their nine opponents, and outscored all opponents 140 to 38.

In the annual Army–Navy Game at the Polo Grounds in New York City, the Cadets lost to the Midshipmen   Army defeated Villanova by a lopsided 62 to 0 score, but lost to Notre Dame  
 
End Earl Blaik was selected by Walter Camp as a third-team player on the All-America Team.

Schedule

Roster
 Earl Blaik

References

Army
Army Black Knights football seasons
Army Cadets football